Dan Doll (born 6 August 1969) is a Canadian luger. He competed at the 1988 Winter Olympics and the 1992 Winter Olympics.

References

External links
 

1969 births
Living people
Canadian male lugers
Olympic lugers of Canada
Lugers at the 1988 Winter Olympics
Lugers at the 1992 Winter Olympics
Lugers from Calgary